The badminton men's team tournament at the 1990 Asian Games in Beijing Sports Complex, Beijing took place from 28 September to 30 September.

China won the gold medal after defeating Malaysia 5–0 in the final, Malaysia finished second, South Korea and Indonesia won the bronze medal by finishing on the 3rd position. South Korea lost 5–0 to China in the semifinal while Indonesia lost a close match  3–2 to regional rival Malaysia.

Japan, Thailand, North Korea and Hong Kong lost in quarterfinals and finished fifth while Pakistan finished 7th after losing to Thailand in 1st round.

Schedule
All times are China Standard Time (UTC+08:00)

Results

1st round

Quarterfinals

Semifinals

Final

References
Results

Men's team